Acoustic at Olympic Studios is an acoustic album by New York-based shoegaze band Asobi Seksu, recorded at Olympic Studios in Barnes, London. The album was first released in February 2009 by One Little Indian Records as a tour-exclusive CD, then reissued and retitled Rewolf by their US label, Polyvinyl Record Co., in November 2009. It contains mostly acoustic versions of songs from Citrus and Hush, as well as a few unique tracks.

Track listing
All songs written by Asobi Seksu, except where noted.
 "Breathe into Glass" – 3:12
 "Walk on the Moon" – 3:56
 "Meh No Mae" – 3:29
 "New Years" – 3:11
 "Blind Little Rain" – 2:40
 "Urusai Tori" – 2:56
 "Suzanne" (Hope Sandoval) – 3:35
 "Gliss" – 4:05
 "Familiar Light" – 3:17
 "Thursday" – 4:24

References

External links
Album page at One Little Indian Records

2009 albums
Asobi Seksu albums